Chersotis laeta is a moth of the family Noctuidae. It is found in number of isolated populations from Greece to the Caucasus, Turkey, Lebanon, Israel and Syria.

Adults are on wing from June to July. There is one generation per year.

Subspecies
Chersotis laeta laeta (western Turkey, southern Turkey, Lebanon, Syria)
Chersotis laeta euxina (Pontic Mountains, Caucasus, Armenia, Elburz)
Chersotis laeta leonhardi (Albania, Bosnia-Herzegovina, Yugoslavia (Macedonia), Greek Macedonia)
Chersotis laeta achaiana (Greece)
Chersotis laeta cretica (Crete)

External links
 Noctuinae of Israel

Noctuinae
Moths of Europe
Moths of Asia